Miguel Arroyo (born 17 June 1962) is a Cuban gymnast. He competed in eight events at the 1980 Summer Olympics.

References

External links
 

1962 births
Living people
Cuban male artistic gymnasts
Olympic gymnasts of Cuba
Gymnasts at the 1980 Summer Olympics
Place of birth missing (living people)